Tyee Mountain is a mountain on Vancouver Island, British Columbia, Canada, located  northeast of Gold River and  northeast of Mount Judson, between the head of the Gold River and the Salmon River, at the northwest end of Strathcona Provincial Park.  "Tyee", which also means "big" and "chief" or "chiefly in the Chinook Jargon, was applied here in its sense of "big" (i.e. the bigger or biggest one).

See also
 List of mountains in Canada
 List of Chinook Jargon placenames

References

Vancouver Island Ranges
Chinook Jargon place names
One-thousanders of British Columbia
Nootka Land District